María Consolación García-Cortés Cadavid (born 3 December 1951), better known as Chelo García-Cortés, is a Spanish journalist who has spent most of her professional career in the field of celebrity gossip.

Early life and career
Although born in Ourense in 1951, at the early age of three months she moved to live with her family in Madrid, returning to Galicia at age sixteen. Currently she is living in Castelldefels, where she has resided for many years. She spends summers at her house in Ibiza.

García-Cortés graduated in Journalism from the Faculty of Information Sciences of the Autonomous University of Barcelona.

From that moment she began working in celebrity gossip, and published her first report in 1976 for the magazine ¡Hola! She was a longtime correspondent for the magazine Diez Minutos in Barcelona, where she had a page called "Por las Ramblas". She also contributed to the magazine Papillón, where she published the first male nude photograph in Spain, of the actor .

Building on her experience in radio and print, García-Cortés made her television debut in 1997 with Jordi González on the TV3 program Les 1000 and one (though she had previously participated in some television programs in Catalonia). Between 1998 and 2004 she also worked on Ana Rosa Quintana's show  on Antena 3.

However she is best known for the gossip talk show  (also known as ¿Dónde estás corazón?) hosted by Jaime Cantizano on Antena 3 from 2003 to 2011.

Together with fellow journalist Jesús Locampos, she wrote the book Yo Acuso, published in 2008 by Grand Guignol. In it, she performs a self-critique of the tabloid press.

Personal life
Chelo García-Cortés's mother died in 1962, when she was only eleven, and she was raised by her father, Rafael García-Cortés Alonso (1916–2001). She has one brother, Mariano García-Cortés Cadavid, who is a photographer. From 1974 to 1984 she was in a relationship with TV presenter . She has been married to Marta Roca Carbonell since 8 August 2005. She has declared herself to be openly bisexual.

References

External links
 

1951 births
Autonomous University of Barcelona alumni
Bisexual women
Gossip columnists
Spanish LGBT journalists
Spanish women journalists
Living people
People from Ourense
Spanish radio personalities
Spanish television journalists
Spanish radio presenters
Spanish women radio presenters
Women television journalists
Spanish columnists
Spanish women columnists
21st-century LGBT people